Alepocephaliformes is an order of ray-finned fish. It was previously classified as the suborder Alepocephaloidei of the order Argentiniformes.

Subdivisions 
 Family Alepocephalidae (typical slickheads) (includes former families Bathylaconidae; Leptochilichthyidae)
 Family Platytroctidae (including Searsiidae)

References 

 
Ray-finned fish orders